Joseph F. DeCarolis is an American scientist and academic who currently serves as the Administrator of the Energy Information Administration in the Biden administration.  His nomination was sent to the United States Senate for consideration on October 4, 2021 and confirmed on March 31, 2022.

Education 

DeCarolis earned a Bachelor of Science degree in physics and environmental science and policy from Clark University, followed by a PhD in engineering and public policy from Carnegie Mellon University.

Career 

From 2004 to 2008, DeCarolis served as an environmental scientist in the United States Environmental Protection Agency. From 2005 to 2008, he was also a part-time instructor at Duke University. He joined the faculty of North Carolina State University in 2008 as an associate professor and has since worked as a full professor. DeCarolis specializes in civil engineering, energy systems, and public policy.

Appointment to Department of Energy 

On September 22, 2021, President Joe Biden nominated DeCarolis to be the administrator of the Energy Information Administration. His initial nomination was returned without hearings held on his nomination on January 3, 2022. President Biden renominated DeCarolis the following day and hearings were held for his nomination by the Senate's Energy Committee on February 8, 2022.

See also 

 TEMOA  Tools for Energy Model Optimization and Analysis, an open source energy system modeling framework

References 

Living people
United States Department of Energy officials
Clark University alumni
Carnegie Mellon University alumni
Duke University faculty
North Carolina State University faculty
Year of birth missing (living people)
Biden administration personnel